Goyjah Bel Rural District is in the Central District of Ahar County, East Azerbaijan province, Iran. At the census of 2006, its population was 5,056 in 1,025 households; there were 4,269 inhabitants in 1,070 households at the following census of 2011; and in the most recent census of 2016, the population of the rural district was 4,307 in 1,260 households. The largest of its 29 villages was Gunjik, with 686 people.

References 

Ahar County

Rural Districts of East Azerbaijan Province

Populated places in East Azerbaijan Province

Populated places in Ahar County